The 1844 United States presidential election in Pennsylvania took place between November 1 and December 4, 1844, as part of the 1844 United States presidential election. Voters chose 26 representatives, or electors to the Electoral College, who voted for President and Vice President.

Pennsylvania voted for the Democratic candidate, James K. Polk, over the Whig candidate, Henry Clay. Polk won Pennsylvania by a narrow margin of 1.91%.

Results

See also
 List of United States presidential elections in Pennsylvania

References

Pennsylvania
1844
1844 Pennsylvania elections